is a former Japanese football player. His younger brother Seiji is also a footballer.

Club career
Koga was born in Okawa on September 8, 1978. After graduating from high school, he joined the Nagoya Grampus Eight in 1997. He became a regular player as a center back from 1998. The club won the 1999 Emperor's Cup. He moved to Kashiwa Reysol in 2007. Although he played as a regular player, he lost his place due to an injury in 2010. He then moved to Júbilo Iwata in August 2010. After playing for two seasons, he moved to his local club Avispa Fukuoka in 2012. He retired at the end of the 2015 season.

National team career
In August 1995, Koga was selected by the Japan U-17 national team for the 1995 U-17 World Championship and he played full time in all three matches. In June 1997, he was also selected by the Japan U-20 national team for the 1997 World Youth Championship, but he did not play in any matches.

Club statistics

References

External links

1978 births
Living people
Association football people from Fukuoka Prefecture
Japanese footballers
Japan youth international footballers
J1 League players
J2 League players
Nagoya Grampus players
Kashiwa Reysol players
Júbilo Iwata players
Avispa Fukuoka players
Footballers at the 1998 Asian Games
Association football defenders
Asian Games competitors for Japan